21 Beacon Street is an American detective television series that originally aired on NBC from July 2 to September 10, 1959.

Produced by Filmways, the first television series by the company, the summer replacement series for The Tennessee Ernie Ford Show consisted of 11 black-and-white 30-minute episodes starring Dennis Morgan as private investigator Dennis Chase.  Other cast members included Joanna Barnes as Lola, his aide; Brian Kelly as Brian, a law school graduate; and James Maloney as Jim, a scientific and dialect specialist.

The pilot for the program was broadcast as an episode of Panic!. The title was the Boston address of Chase, who would pass each case to the police after solving the crime.

The show aired on Thursdays at 9:30 p.m. Eastern Time, and was then carried by ABC-TV in reruns on Sundays at 10:30 p.m. from December 27, 1959, to March 20, 1960, as a replacement for Dick Clark's World of Talent. The producer was Al Simon.

Leonard Heideman was the show's creator.

The program's first episode was "The Rub-Out".

The producers of Mission: Impossible were sued for plagiarism by the creators of 21 Beacon Street. The suit was settled out of court. Bruce Geller claimed never to have seen the earlier show; Beacon Street's story editor and pilot scripter, Laurence Heath, would later write several episodes of Mission: Impossible.

References

.

External links

Cimaclub Online

1959 American television series debuts
1959 American television series endings
1950s American crime television series
Black-and-white American television shows
NBC original programming
English-language television shows
Television shows set in Boston
Detective television series
Television series by MGM Television
Television series by Filmways